Jean-François Anne Landriot (b. at Couches-les-Mines near Autun, 1816, d. at Reims, 1874) was a French bishop, Ordained in 1839 from the seminary of Autun, he became, after a few years spent at the cathedral, successively superior of the seminary, 1842; vicar-general 1850; Bishop of La Rochelle, 1856, and Archbishop of Reims, 1867.

Life

During his ten years at La Rochelle he restored the cathedral, organized the Propagation of the Faith and the Peter's-pence collections, and won a reputation as a pulpit orator. At Reims, besides preaching many Advent and Lenten stations, he raised a large subscription for the pontifical army, established several educational institutions, founded an asylum for the aged, and entrusted St. Walfroy to the Priests of the Mission.

As a member of the First Vatican Council, he deemed inopportune the definition of papal infallibility, but, once decreed, he adhered to its promulgation and wrote to his diocesans urging them to accept it. Lacroix ("Mgr. Landriot pendant l'occupation allemande", Reims, 1898) shows Landriot's influence in allaying the measure of rigor resorted to by the victorious Germans during their occupation of Reims in 1870. In the question of the ancient classics Landriot refused to subscribe to the extreme views of Jean-Joseph Gaume and L'Univers.

Works
An eloquent preacher, he was also an ascetic writer of note. Beside his pastoral works collected in the "(Euvres de Mgr. Landriot" (7 vols., Paris, 1864–74), we have from his pen, all published in Paris:

"Recherches historiques sur les écoles littéraires du Christianisme" (1851); 
"Examen critique des lettres de l'Abbé Gaume sur le paganisme dans l'éducation" (1852); 
"La femme forte" (1862); 
"La femme pieuse" (1863); 
"La prière chrétienne" (1863); 
"Le Christ et la tradition" (1865); 
"Les béatitudes évangéliques" (1865); 
"Le Symbolisme" (1866); 
"L'Eucharistie" (1866); 
"La Sainte Communion" (1872); 
"L'Autorité et la liberté" (1872); 
"L'esprit chrétien dans l'enseignement" (1873); 
"Instructions sur l'oraison dominicale" (1873); 
"L'Esprit Saint" (1879), etc.

References

La France ecclesiastique (Paris, 1875)
L'episcopat francais depuis le concordat jusqu a la separation (Paris, 1907), s.vv., La Rochelle and Reims: 
biographies by Menu (Reims, 1867), Causette (Reims, 1874), Arsac (Reims, 1874), Reidot (Autun, 1895)

External links
Catholic Encyclopedia article

1816 births
1874 deaths
Archbishops of Reims